HMS Harlequin was a 16-gun  built for the Royal Navy during the 1830s.

Description
The ship's tonnage was 432  tons burthen. The Racer class was armed with a pair of 9-pounder (or 18-pounder) cannon and fourteen 32-pounder carronades. The ships had a crew of 120 officers and ratings.

Construction and career
Harlequin, the fifth ship of her name to serve in the Royal Navy, was ordered on 28 March 1832, laid down in November 1832 at Pembroke Dockyard, Wales, and launched on 18 March 1836. She was completed on 25 October at Plymouth Dockyard and commissioned on 16 August of the same year.

Notes

References

External links
 

Racer-class brig-sloop
1836 ships
Ships built in Pembroke Dock